James Tabor, D.D. was the fifth recorded Registrary of the University of Cambridge from 1600 until his death.

Mere was born in Essex. He entered Corpus Christi College, Cambridge in 1593. He graduated B.A. in 1597 and M.A. in 1600.  He was Clerk of the Sewers for the town of Cambridge. He died on 16 July 1645.

References

1645 deaths
Alumni of Corpus Christi College, Cambridge
Registraries of the University of Cambridge
People from Essex